The 1992 Norwegian Football Cup was the 87th edition of the Norwegian Football Cup. The 1992 Norwegian Football Cup was won by Rosenborg after they defeated Lillestrøm in the final on 25 October 1992.

Calendar
Below are the dates for each round as given by the official schedule:

First round 

|colspan="3" style="background-color:#97DEFF"|26 May 1992

|-
|colspan="3" style="background-color:#97DEFF"|27 May 1992

|-
|colspan="3" style="background-color:#97DEFF"|28 May 1992

|-
|colspan="3" style="background-color:#97DEFF"|11 June 1992

|-
|colspan="3" style="background-color:#97DEFF"|14 June 1992

|-
|colspan="3" style="background-color:#97DEFF"|17 June 1992

|}

Second round 

|colspan="3" style="background-color:#97DEFF"|10 June 1992

|-
|colspan="3" style="background-color:#97DEFF"|11 June 1992

|-
|colspan="3" style="background-color:#97DEFF"|16 June 1992

|-
|colspan="3" style="background-color:#97DEFF"|17 June 1992

|-
|colspan="3" style="background-color:#97DEFF"|23 June 1992

|}

Third round 

|colspan="3" style="background-color:#97DEFF"|24 June 1992

|-
|colspan="3" style="background-color:#97DEFF"|25 June 1992

|}

Fourth round

|colspan="3" style="background-color:#97DEFF"|22 July 1992

|-
|colspan="3" style="background-color:#97DEFF"|Replay: 29 July 1992

|}

Quarter-finals

Semi-finals

Final

References
http://www.rsssf.no
 Arvid Eriksen (editor) Sportsboken 1992/93, Schibsted. .

Norwegian Football Cup seasons
Norway
Football Cup